Randy Leen (born December 22, 1975) is a retired American professional golfer.

High school career 
Leen was born in Dayton, Ohio. He graduated from Archbishop Alter High School in Kettering, Ohio.

College career 
Leen was a three time All-American and three time Big Ten Conference player of the year for the Indiana Hoosiers.

Amateur career 
Leen was the low amateur at the 1996 U.S. Open, beating out Tiger Woods by three shots. He played on the 1997 Walker Cup team.

Professional career 
Leen turned professional in 1998. He played on the Buy.com Tour in 2000. After many years on the mini-tours, he played on the Nationwide Tour in 2008, but did not earn enough money to keep his card.

Honors 
In 2011, he joined the Dayton Amateur Golf Hall of Fame.

U.S. national team appearances 
Amateur
Walker Cup: 1997 (winners)

References

External links

American male golfers
Indiana Hoosiers men's golfers
Golfers from Ohio
Sportspeople from Dayton, Ohio
1975 births
Living people